Kemuda Institute (KI) is a private college in Brunei. It was established in 2004 and has campuses in Beribi in Bandar Seri Begawan and Kuala Belait in Belait District. Kemuda Institute mainly provides vocational courses in computing and information technology, leading up to BTEC qualification by Pearson as well as diplomas by NCC Education, two UK-based vocational qualifications providers. The current Chairman of Kemuda Institute is Dato Paduka Haji Abdul Razak bin Muhammad, who is also the founder of the college.

References

Universities and colleges in Brunei
2004 establishments in Brunei
Educational institutions established in 2004